In cryptanalysis, gardening is the act of encouraging a target to use known plaintext in an encrypted message. It was a term used at the British Government Code and Cypher School at Bletchley Park, England, during World War II, for schemes to entice the Germans to include particular words, which the British called "cribs", in their encrypted messages. This term presumably came from RAF minelaying missions, or "gardening" sorties. "Gardening" was standard RAF slang for sowing mines in rivers, ports and oceans from low heights, possibly because each sea area around the European coasts was given a code-name of flowers or vegetables.

The technique is claimed to have been most effective against messages produced by the German Navy's Enigma machines. If the Germans had recently swept a particular area for mines, and analysts at Bletchley Park were in need of some cribs, they might (and apparently did on several occasions) request that the area be mined again. This would hopefully evoke encrypted messages from the local command mentioning Minen (German for mines) and/or the location, and perhaps messages also from the headquarters with minesweeping ships to assign to that location, mentioning the same. It worked often enough to try several times.

This crib-based decryption is an example of a chosen-plaintext attack, because plain text effectively chosen by the British was injected into the ciphertext.

See also
Cryptanalysis of the Enigma
Known-plaintext attack

Notes

Cryptographic attacks
Bletchley Park